Nigel Wild Wild Wild is a TV Special presented by zoologist Nigel Marven.
The program ran from 2001-2002 in 27 episodes.

List of episodes

Giants:Bears
Host Nigel Marven goes to Minnesota's Vince Shute Reserve to observe and understand black bears; to Alaska's Katmai National Park to watch brown bears later he goes to the Canadian town of Churchill to examine polar bears.

Wild Africa: Coasts

Hotel Iguana

Wild Africa: Mountains

Viper

References

External links

2001 American television series debuts
2002 American television series endings
Discovery Channel original programming